Cylindrepomus nigriceps is a species of beetle in the family Cerambycidae. It was described by Franz in 1971. It is known from Sulawesi.

References

Dorcaschematini
Beetles described in 1971